SIRC may refer to:

 Security Intelligence Review Committee, an independent agency of the government of Canada empowered to oversee and review the operations of the Canadian Security Intelligence Service
 Styrene Information and Research Center, a not for profit organization whose membership represents approximately 95% of the North American styrene industry.
 Seafarers International Research Centre, a constituent Centre of the Cardiff University School of Social Sciences
 Sony Infrared Remote Control, a protocol for remote controls
 Social Issues Research Centre, an independent, non-profit organisation founded to conduct research on social and lifestyle issues
 Sydney International Regatta Centre, location of rowing event in Sydney 2000 Olympics
 Southern India Regional Council, of various organisations like ICAI, ICWAI etc. 
 as SIRCS, the Shipboard Intermediate Range Combat System